La Chapelle-Saint-Sépulcre is a commune in the Loiret department in north-central France. It is part of the canton of Courtenay and of the arrondissement of Montargis.

See also
Communes of the Loiret department

References

Chapellesaintsepulcre